Hour Game is a crime fiction novel written by American writer David Baldacci. This is the second installment in the King and Maxwell book series. The book was published on October 26, 2004, by Warner Books.

Plot
A woman is found murdered in the woods. It seems like a simple case, but soon escalates into a terrible nightmare. Someone is replicating the killing styles of the most infamous murderers of all time. No one knows this criminal's motives—or who will die next.

Two ex-Secret Service agents, Sean King and Michelle Maxwell, have been hired to defend a man's innocence in a burglary involving an aristocratic family. Then a series of secrets leads the partners right into a frantic hunt that is confounding even the FBI. Now King and Maxwell are playing the Hour Game, uncovering one horrifying revelation after another and putting their lives in danger. For the closer they get to the truth, the closer they get to the most shocking surprise of all.

References

External links
Official website

2004 American novels
Novels by David Baldacci